Erhardt v. Boaro, 113 U.S. 527 (1885), was an action for the possession of a mining claim in Pioneer mining district, in the County of Dolores, and State of Colorado. The claim was designated by the plaintiff as "The Hawk Lode" mining claim, and by the defendants as "The Johnny Bull Lode" mining claim. It contains two counts. The first alleges that the right of possession of the claim by the plaintiff on June 17, 1880, is by virtue of its location pursuant to the laws of the United States and of the state, and the local rules and customs of miners in the district, and by virtue of priority of possession, the wrongful entry upon the premises by the defendants on the thirtieth of that month, their outing the plaintiff therefrom, and unlawfully withholding the possession from him, to his damage of $50,000. The second count, in addition to the citizenship of the parties, the possession of the claim by the plaintiff, and the subsequent wrongful entry of the defendants, and their ousting him, alleges that the defendants worked and mined in the claim, and dug out and removed from it large quantities of gold and silver bearing ore of the value of $50,000, to the damage of the plaintiff in that amount. The plaintiff therefore prays judgment for the possession of the mining premises and for damages of $100,000.

The answer of the defendants contains a specific denial of the several allegations of the complaint, and as to that it avers their want of information and demands proof. And it sets up the discovery of the claim in controversy on June 30, 1880, by the defendants Boaro and Hull, to which they gave the designation of "The Johnny Bull Lode," and its definite location and record within ninety days thereafter, and their subsequent relocation of the claim September 8, 1880, to avoid a conflict with an adjoining claim. They pray therefore that they may be decreed its possession and ownership in accordance with their rights.

In the trial, the plaintiff produced evidence showing that on June 17, 1880, one Thomas Carroll, a citizen of the United States, while searching, on behalf of himself and the plaintiff, also a citizen, for valuable deposits of mineral, discovered, on vacant unoccupied land of the public domain of the United States in the Pioneer mining district mentioned, the outcrop of a vein or lode of quartz and other rock bearing gold and silver in valuable and paying quantities; that by an agreement between him and the plaintiff, pursuant to which the explorations were prosecuted, all lodes and veins discovered by him were to be located, one-fifth in his name and four-fifths in the name of the plaintiff; that on the day of his discovery, Carroll designated the vein or lode as the "Hawk Lode," and posted at the point of discovery a plain sign, or notice in writing, as follows:

HAWK LODE

We, the undersigned, claim 1,500 feet on this mineral-bearing lode, vein, or deposit. Dated June 17, 1880.

JOEL B. ERHARDT, 4/5ths

THOMAS CARROLL, 1/5th

that on the same day at the point of his discovery, Carroll commenced excavating a discovery shaft, and sank the same to the depth of about eighteen inches or two feet on the vein; that on the 30th of the month, in the temporary absence of himself and the plaintiff, the defendant Boaro, with knowledge of the rights and claims of the plaintiff and Carroll, entered upon and took possession of their excavation, removed and threw away or concealed the stake upon which their written notice was posted, and at the point of Carroll's discovery of the vein or lode, erected a stake and posted thereon a discovery and location notice as follows:

JOHNNY BULL LODE

We, the undersigned, claim 1,500 feet on this mineral-bearing vein or lode, running six hundred feet northeast and nine hundred feet southwest, and 150 feet on each side of the same, with all its dips and spurs, angles, and variations.

June 30, 1880.

ANTHONY BOARO

W. L. HULL

The evidence also showed that Boaro and Hull entered upon the premises on or about July 21, 1880, and remained thereafter continuously in possession; that threats of violence to the plaintiff and Carroll, if they should enter upon the premises or attempt to take possession of them, were communicated to Carroll as having been made by Boaro early in August following; that in consequence of such threats and the possession held by Boaro, Carroll was prevented from resuming work upon and completing the discovery shaft, and from entering upon any other part of the lode or vein and performing the acts of location required by law within the time limited. The evidence also tended to show that within ninety days from the discovery of the lode by Carroll, one French, on behalf of the plaintiff and Carroll, secretly caused the boundaries of the claim to be marked by six substantial posts, so as to include the place of discovery and the premises in controversy, and filed in the office of the recorder of the county a location certificate setting forth the name of the lode, the date of the location, the names of the plaintiff and Carroll as locators, and the course of the lode or vein, and giving such a description of the claim, with reference to natural objects and permanent landmarks, as would suffice to identify the same with reasonable certainty.

The evidence offered by the defendants rebutted that of the plaintiff, and showed that on June 30, 1880, when Boaro entered upon the ground in controversy, he found nothing on the surface to indicate a vein or lode, or that any excavation had been made or stake erected, as alleged by the plaintiff, or that any portion of the ground claimed by the defendants had ever been previously located or claimed; that their discovery cut was commenced at a point thirty-five feet distant from the point described and claimed by Carroll as the point at which he had begun to sink the discovery shaft of the "Hawk Lode," and erected his stake and posted his notice, and that the top of the vein was at least four feet below the surface; that Carroll had abandoned all claim to the premises in controversy, and that his omission to perform the required location work was due to such abandonment, and not to any threats of the defendants, or of any of them, nor to the occupation of the ground by Boaro and Hull, or either of them; that neither the plaintiff nor Carroll ever demanded possession of or asserted any title to the premises until the working of the claim by the defendants had shown it to be valuable.

The evidence of the defendants also showed that they had commenced work upon the claim about July 21, 1880, and sank and excavated an open cut, striking the vein or lode at the depth of ten feet or more, and exposed therein a vein of rock in place bearing gold and silver; that no mineral nor any indications of a vein or lode were found until they reached the depth of seven or eight feet, and that subsequently, and within the time limited by law, they marked the bounds of their claim on said lode, called by them the "Johnny Bull Lode" and recorded a location certificate, describing their claim by reference to natural objects and permanent landmarks and complying in all respects with the requirements of the law.

The court was requested to instruct the jury that from and after the date of the discovery upon vacant, unoccupied mineral lands, of the outcrop of a vein or body of mineral-bearing rock, the discoverer is entitled to the possession of the point at which he made his discovery and of such a reasonable amount of adjacent ground as is necessary or incidental to the proper prosecution of the work of opening up or exposing the vein or body of mineral-bearing rock to the depth and within the time required by law, and that to such extent he is protected by law in his possession for the period of sixty days from the date of his discovery. But the court refused to give this instruction, and the plaintiff excepted to the refusal. The court charged the jury, among other things, that it was in evidence, and seemed to be conceded, that the notice on the stake put up by Carroll contained no specification or description of the territory claimed by the locators, as that they claimed a number of feet on each side of the discovery or in any direction therefrom, and "in this respect," said the court, "the notice was deficient, and under it the locators could not claim more than the very place in which it was planted. Elsewhere on the same lode or vein, if it extended beyond the point in controversy, any other citizen could make a valid location, for this notice, specifying no bounds or limits, could not be said to have any extent beyond what would be necessary for sinking a shaft," and also that to entitle the plaintiff to recover, "it should appear from the evidence that Boaro entered at the very place which had been taken by Carroll, because, as Carroll's notice failed to specify the territory he wished to take, it could not refer to or embrace any other place than that in which it was planted."

The defendant obtained a verdict, the plaintiff brought the case to the high court on writ of error to review the judgment entered thereon.

Justice Field delivered the opinion of the Court.

The high court reversed the judgment of the court below, and the case remanded for a new trial.

See also
List of United States Supreme Court cases, volume 113

References

External links
 

United States Supreme Court cases
1885 in United States case law
Dolores County, Colorado
Legal history of Colorado
United States Supreme Court cases of the Waite Court